The Good Earth is the second album by American alternative rock band The Feelies. It was released in 1986 on Coyote Records, six years following their debut album Crazy Rhythms. The original LP was contained in a sleeve designed by Glenn Mercer, featuring a front cover photo of the band by bassist Brenda Sauter and a back cover photo by John Baumgartner with coloring by Sauter.

Track listing

Personnel
Glenn Mercer – lead and rhythm guitars, vocals, keyboards
Bill Million – rhythm and lead guitars, backing vocals
Dave Weckerman – percussion
Brenda Sauter – bass guitar, backing vocals, violin
Stan Demeski – drums, percussion

References

The Feelies albums
1986 albums
Albums produced by Peter Buck
Rough Trade Records albums
Bar/None Records albums
Domino Recording Company albums